The Mount Kemble Home is a historic building located at 1 Mount Kemble Avenue in the town of Morristown in Morris County, New Jersey. Part of the Morristown Multiple Resource Area (MRA), it was added to the National Register of Historic Places on November 13, 1986, for its significance in architecture.

History and description
The main section and north wing of the building were built . It was remodeled  and a south wing added in 1905. The two and one-half story building features several architectural styles, described in the nomination form as vernacular Federal with Carpenter Gothic/Stick and Colonial Revival embellishment.

In 1878, Charles E. Noble purchased the property and remodeled it. In 1890, he sold it to a group of seven women from the Morristown Presbyterian Church, for use as a Home for Worthy and Destitute Women. In 1905, Alfred R. Whitney financed the south wing expansion and the building was renamed the Old Ladies Home. In 1940, the name was changed to the current one, Mount Kemble Home.

See also
 National Register of Historic Places listings in Morris County, New Jersey

References

External links
 

Morristown, New Jersey	
Buildings and structures in Morris County, New Jersey
National Register of Historic Places in Morris County, New Jersey
1826 establishments in New Jersey
New Jersey Register of Historic Places